Ward's field mouse (Apodemus pallipes)  is a species of rodent in the family Muridae.
It is found in Kyrgyzstan, Tajikistan, Afghanistan, India, Iran, Nepal, and Pakistan.

References

Apodemus
Mammals of Afghanistan
Mammals of Pakistan
Mammals of Nepal
Mammals described in 1900
Taxa named by Gerald Edwin Hamilton Barrett-Hamilton
Taxonomy articles created by Polbot